Jack River (postcode: 3971) is a small settlement in the Shire of Wellington in southwestern Gippsland, in the Australian state of Victoria.

At the 2011 census, Jack River had a population of 301.

References

Towns in Victoria (Australia)
Shire of Wellington